History of clothing in the Indian subcontinent can be traced to the Indus Valley civilization or earlier. Indians have mainly worn clothing made up of locally grown cotton. India was one of the first places where cotton was cultivated and used even as early as 2500 BCE during the Harappan era. The remnants of the ancient Indian clothing can be found in the figurines discovered from the sites near the Indus Valley civilisation, the rock-cut sculptures, the cave paintings, and human art forms found in temples and monuments. These scriptures view the figures of human wearing clothes which can be wrapped around the body. Taking the instances of the sari to that of turban and the dhoti, the traditional Indian wears were mostly tied around the body in various ways.

Indus Valley Civilisation period 
Evidence for textiles in Indus Valley civilisation are not available from preserved textiles but from impressions made into clay and from preserved pseudomorphs. The only evidence found for clothing is from iconography and some unearthed Harappan figurines which are usually unclothed. These little depictions show that usually men wore a long cloth wrapped over their waist and fastened it at the back (just like a close clinging dhoti). Turban was also in custom in some communities as shown by some of the male figurines. Evidence also shows that there was a tradition of wearing a long robe over the left shoulder in higher class society to show their opulence. The normal attire of the women at that time was a very scanty skirt up to knee length leaving the waist bare. Cotton made headdresses were also worn by the women. Women also wore long skirt, stitched tight tunic on their upper body and trousers as well. Inferences from mother goddess statue from Delhi National Museum suggests female wearing a short tunic with a short skirt and trousers. There also evidences of men wearing trousers, conical gown/tunic with an upper waist band. The mother goddess statues show women also wearing heavy earrings which were also pretty common in the historic period of India and also depict with heavy necklaces with overhanging medallion with holes in them for gemstones. Female statues and terracotta arts and figurines like a dancing girl also depict long hairs probably braided and draped in cloth.

Fibre for clothing generally used were cotton, flax, silk, wool, linen, leather, etc. One fragment of colored cloth is available in pieces of evidence which are dyed with red madder show that people in Harappan civilisation dyed their cotton clothes with a range of colors.

One thing was common in both the sexes that both men and women were fond of jewelry. The ornaments include necklaces, bracelets, earrings, anklet, rings, bangles, pectorals, etc. which were generally made of gold, silver, copper, stones like lapis lazuli, turquoise, amazonite, quartz, etc. Many of the male figurines also reveal the fact that men at that time were interested in dressing their hair in various styles like the hair woven into a booty, hair coiled in a ring on the top of the head, beards were usually trimmed. Indus Valley Civilization men are frequently depicted wearing headbands especially to contain hair bun at the back. People have been shown wearing elaborate headdresses like turban, conical hats, pakol hats.

Dressing of Indus valley civilization people show presence of multi-ethnic people of diverse backgrounds for instance people have been depicted wearing Pashtun style pakol hat with a chocker like neck ornament as well as Punjabi style pagri and Rajasthani style bangles and necklaces and many other styles prominent in neighbouring regions of the Indian subcontinent.

Some scholars, such as Jonathan Mark Kenoyer, have argued that headdress from the royal cemetery of Ur is an import from Indus Valley Civilization since similar headdresses have been found to have been depicted in many of its Mother Goddess figurines and actual ones discovered from sites such as Kunal and the floral depiction in gold leaves of species native to Indian subcontinent such as Dalbergia sissoo or pipal, and since no such ornamentation has been shown in Mesopotamian art itself.

Ancient period

Vedic period 
The Vedic period was the time duration between 1500 and 500 BCE. The garments worn in the Vedic period mainly included a single cloth wrapped around the whole body and draped over the shoulder. People used to wear the lower garment called paridhana which was pleated in front and used to tie with a belt called mekhala and an upper garment called uttariya (covered like a shawl) which they used to remove during summers. "Orthodox males and females usually wore the uttariya by throwing it over the left shoulder only, in the style called upavita". There was another garment called pravara that they used to wear in cold. This was the general garb of both the sexes but the difference existed only in size of cloth and manner of wearing. Sometimes the poor people used to wear the lower garment as a loincloth only while the wealthy would wear it extending to the feet as a sign of prestige.

In the Rig Veda, mainly three terms were described like Adhivastra, Kurlra, and Andpratidhi for garments which correspondingly denotes the outer cover (veil), a head-ornament or head-dress (turban) and part of woman's dress. Many pieces of evidence are found for ornaments like Niska, Rukma were used to wear in the ear and neck; there was a great use of gold beads in necklaces which show that gold was mainly used in jewellery. Rajata-Hiranya (white gold), also known as silver was not in that much of use as no evidence of silver is figured out in the Rig Veda.

In the Atharva Veda, garments began to be made of the inner cover, an outer cover, and a chest-cover. Besides Kurlra and Andpratidhi (which already mentioned in the Rig Veda), there are other parts like as Nivi, Vavri, Upavasana, Kumba, Usnlsa, and Tirlta also appeared in Atharva Veda, which correspondingly denotes underwear, upper garment, veil and the last three denoting some kinds of head-dress (head-ornament). There were also mentioned Updnaha (Footwear) and Kambala (blanket), Mani (jewel) is also mentioned for making ornaments in this Vedic text.

Pre-Mauryan era 
Even though scholars have debated the archaeological evidence from the pre-Mauryan era, a lot of terracotta artifacts by various scholars have been dated to the pre-Mauryan era which shows continuity of the dressing styles leading up to the Mauryan period. The terracotta also contain naturalistic style of depicting human faces just like Mauryan periods. The pre-Mauryan periods have been marked by the continuation of Indus arts and depict elaborate headdresses, conical hats with heavy earring. Bronze rattling mirror excavated from Pazyryk dated to the 4th century BC also depict Indians wearing typical Indian classical clothing such as dhoti wrap and tight-fitting half sleeved stitched shirts like kurta. Another pre-Mauryan archaeological evidence of Indian dressing comes from Saurashtra janapada coins which are one of the earliest representations of Indian pre-Mauryan arts. The coins are dated between 450 and 300 BCE and have been repeatedly over struck just like punch-marked coins.

Mauryan period 

During the Mauryan dynasty (322–185 BC) the earliest evidence of stitched female clothing is available from the statue of a woman(from Mathura, 3rd century BCE). Ladies in the Mauryan Empire often used to wear an embroidered fabric waistband with drum-headed knots at the ends. As an upper garment, people's main garment was uttariya, a long scarf. The difference existed only in the manner of wearing. Sometimes, its one end is thrown over one shoulder and sometimes it is draped over both shoulders.
 
In textiles, mainly cotton, silk, linen, wool, muslin, etc. are used as fibers. Ornaments latched on to a special place in this era also. Some of the jewelry had their specific names also. Satlari, chaulari, paklari were some of the necklaces.

Men wore Antariya (knee-length, worn in kachcha style with the fluted end tucked in at center front) and Tunic (one of the earliest depictions of the cut and sewn garment; it has short sleeves and a round neck, full front opening with ties at the neck and waist, and is hip length). A statue of a warrior shows Boots (fitting to the knees cap) and a band (tied at the back over short hair). A broad flat sword with cross straps on the sheath is suspended from the left shoulder.

Classical period

Early classical period 
Early classical period has ample evidence of dresses worn by ancient Indians in several relief sculptures which depict not only the dressing styles, but also architecture and lifestyle of the period. Buddhist reliefs from Amravathi, Gandhara, Mathura, and many other sites contain carved reliefs from Jataka tales and exhibit the fashion of the period between the 2nd century BCE to Gupta periods.

Gupta period 
The Gupta period lasted from 320 CE to 550 CE. Chandragupta I was the founder of this empire. Stitched garments became very popular in this period. Stitched garments became a sign of royalty.

The antariya worn by the women turned into gagri, which has many swirling effects exalted by its many folds. Hence dancers used to wear it a lot. As it is evident from many Ajanta paintings, women used to wear only the lower garment in those times, leaving the bust part bare but these depictions may be a stylistic representation of mother goddess cult since Indus Valley Civilization. Whereas women with stitched upper body garment or tunic have been shown from pre-Mauryan period as early as 400 BCE in a folk art depicted on Pazyryk rattling mirrors. Ujjain coin from 200 BCE depicts a man wearing achkan. Depictions from terracotta clay tablets from Chandraketugarh show women wearing clothes made of muslin. Various kinds of blouses (cholis) evolved. Some of them had strings attached leaving the back open while others were used to tie from the front side, exposing the midriff.

Clothing in the Gupta period was mainly cut and sewn garments. A long sleeved brocaded tunic became the main costume for privileged people like the nobles and courtiers. The main costume for the king was most often a blue closely woven silk antariya, perhaps with a block printed pattern. In order to tighten the antariya, a plain belt took the position of kayabandh.
Mukatavati (necklace which has a string with pearls), kayura (armband), kundala (earring), kinkini (small anklet with bells), mekhala (pendant hung at the centre, also known as katisutra), nupura (anklet made of beads) were some of the ornaments made of gold, used in that time. There was extensive use of ivory during that period for jewellery and ornaments.

During the Gupta period, men used to have long hair along with beautiful curls and this style was popularly known as gurna kuntala style. In order to decorate their hair, they sometimes put headgear, a band of fabric around their hairs. On the other hand, women used to decorate their hair with luxuriant ringlets or a jewelled band or a chaplet of flowers. They often used to make a bun on the top of the head or sometimes low on the neck, surrounded by flowers or ratnajali (bejewelled net) or muktajala (net of pearls).

In south

Chalukyas of vatapi
Chalukyas of vatapi have unique clothing, they wore veshti in different styles sometimes veshti goes under knees. The uniqueness of jewelleries is the presence of thigh band.

Medieval period 
From post-Gupta period, there is plentiful evidence of Indian clothing from paintings such as in Alchi monastery, Bagan temples, Pala miniature paintings, Jain miniature paintings, Ellora caves paintings and Indian sculptures. Ancient Indians wearing kurta and baggy pants like shalwar have been depicted in 8-10th century CE ivory sculpture of an elephant chess piece from Bibliothèque Nationale, Paris, France. From the Late medieval period, there are increased evidences of pajamas and shalwar becoming common in Indian attire while unstitched dhoti keeps its prominence as well. From Al-Biruni's Tarikh ul Hind. The kurtas, which are called Kurtakas in Sanskrit, are half sleeved shirts with slits of both sides are described along with other clothing such as Kurpasaka which is a type of jacket similar to kurta, he also mentions that some Indians preferred dhoti while others dressed more by wearing baggy trousers similar to shalwar. The Alchi painting also shows evidence of modern sari draping and Bagan temple paintings frequently depict Indians with long beards wearing big earring. Paintings from regions of the Indian subcontinent, including Bihar, Bengal, Indus Valley and Nepal depict various clothing attires of eastern Indian states including modern styles of wearing dupatta.

Early Modern period

Mughal Empire 

The Mughal dynasty included luxury clothes that complemented interest in art and poetry.  Both men and women were fond of jewellery. Clothing fibers generally included muslins of three types: Ab-e-Rawan (running water), Baft Hawa (woven air) and Shabnam (evening dew) and the other fibers were silks, velvets and brocades. Mughal royal dresses consisted of many parts as listed below. Mughal women wore a large variety of ornaments from head to toe. Their costumes generally included Pajama, Churidar, Shalwar, Garara and the Farshi , they all included head ornaments, anklets, and necklaces. This was done as a distinctive mark of their prosperity and their rank in society.

During the Mughal period, there was an extensive 
tradition of wearing embroidered footwear,  With ornamented leather and decorated with the art of Aughi. Lucknow footwear was generally favoured by nobles and kings.

Rajputs 

Rajputs emerged in the 7th and 8th century as a community of Ancient Kshatriya people. Rajputs followed a traditional lifestyle for living which shows their martial spirit, ethnicity, and chivalric grandeur.

Men 
Rajput's main costumes were the aristocratic dresses (court-dress) which includes angarkhi, pagdi, chudidar pyjama and a cummerbund (belt). Angarkhi (short jacket) is long upper part of garments which they used to wear over a sleeveless close-fitting cloth. Nobles of Ahirs generally attired themselves in the Jama, Shervani as an upper garment and Salvar, Churidar-Pyjama (a pair of shaped trousers) as lower garments. The Dhoti was also in tradition in that time but styles were different to wear it. Tevata style of dhoti was prominent in the desert region and Tilangi style in the other regions. Ahir style dhoti were give royal look .

Women 
"To capture the sensuality of the female figures in Rajput paintings, women were depicted wearing transparent fabrics draped around their bodies". Rajput women's main attire was the Sari (wrapped over whole body and one of the ends thrown on the right shoulder) or Lengha related with the Rajasthani traditional dress. On the occasion (marriage) women preferred  Angia. After marriage of Kanchli, Kurti, and angia were the main garb of women. The young girls used to wear the Puthia as an upper garment made of pure cotton fabric and the Sulhanki as lower garments (loose pajama). Widows and unmarried women clothed themselves with Polka (half sleeved which ends at the waist) and Ghaghra as a voluminous gored skirt made of line satin, organza or silk. Another important part of clothing is Odhna of women which are worked in silk.

Jewellery preferred by women were exquisite in the style or design. One of the most jewellery called Rakhdi (head ornament), Machi-suliya (ears) and Tevata, Pattia, and the aad (all is necklace). Rakhdi, nath and chuda show the married woman's status. The footwear is the same for men and women and named Juti made of leather.

Sikhs 
Sikhism was founded in the 15th century. In 1699, the last guru of Sikhism, Guru Gobind Singh mandated Khalsa Sikh men to have uncut hair for their lives, which they wear into a turban or dastar. The dastar has since then been an integral part of the Sikh culture.

British colonial period 

During the British colonial period, Indian clothing went through many changes and began to reflect an evident European influence. The British had a strict set of rules for attire, as they viewed themselves as culturally superior. These new clothing norms arrived alongside new rules around government, education, and class structure.

Upper and middle-class Indian men wore western clothing in public, often doing so because it brought them closer to being equal with European men. At first, this included combining elements of Indian and Western clothing, as some men would wear a 'dhoti' (loose lower garment) with a shirt and coat. Others started wearing a sherwani, which fused together the British frock coat and an achkan. Eventually, some men started wearing full European styles, like a pantsuit. Although one major difference that remained between Indian and European men's fashion was the style and etiquette of head coverings. Some Indian men wore this for religious purposes, like turbans and phetas. For Indian men, it was important to wear this at all times in public, whereas European men would generally remove it. Thus, we see that Indian men’s fashion experienced changes through the fusion of cultures.

Women's clothing and fashion were also influenced by the British. They did not wear fully western clothes like men, but many started to wear petticoats and certain blouse styles under their saris. Both of these articles of clothing were brought to India by Europeans. These new articles of clothing also created some tension between castes. One major instance of this was in Kerala, where only upper-caste women were allowed to wear blouses. Though, from 1813 to 1859 the Channar Revolt was supported by Christian missionaries who wanted Indian women to wear blouses.

Another influence of the British on Indian women's clothing was the introduction of new materials. They started using mill-made cloth and other imported satins and artificial silks. A few reasons for using these new materials include that they were cheaper to produce and were more versatile than the cloth used in India. Sometimes these new styles were also more functional for Indian women. The adoption of these new textiles and styles was seen as a sign of upward mobility in British-Indian society.

The British also impacted the textile industry in India because of industrialization and using their own mills instead of artisans in India. This led to the unemployment of many Indians. Later, Gandhi called for Indian people to make and wear their own hand-spun clothing, called khadi cloth, as a sign of resistance against the British. This was part of the Swadeshi movement. In fact, we can see that small-scale artisan clothing producers did not disappear from India during the 20th century as they continued to make up a significant share of industrial output.

Post-Independence 
Western clothing has gained increasing popularity, especially in the metropolitan cities. This has also led to the development of the Indo-Western style. Bollywood has also been a major influence in fashion around the subcontinent, especially in Indian fashion.

Gallery

See also
Clothing in India
Folk costume
History of Textile industry in India
Indo-Western clothing
Fashion in India
1950s in Indian fashion
1960s in Indian fashion
1970s in Eastern fashion
1980s in Indian fashion
1990s in Indian fashion
2000s in Asian fashion
2010s in Indian fashion

References

Indian clothing
History of Asian clothing
Cultural history of India